Samuel Swire may refer to:
 Samuel Swire (cricketer)
 Samuel Swire (businessman)